YTL Power International Berhad, a subsidiary of YTL Corporation, generates and sells power as an independent power producer to Tenaga Nasional for uploading onto the National Grid, Malaysia.

In December 2010, YTL Power acquired 30% stake in Eesti Energia's oil shale development project in Jordan.

See also
National Grid, Malaysia
Tenaga Nasional
YTL Communications

References

External links
 YTL Corporation webpage

Companies listed on Bursa Malaysia
Electric power companies of Malaysia